Obhausen is a municipality in the Saalekreis district, Saxony-Anhalt, Germany. In January 2010 it absorbed the former municipality Esperstedt.

References

Municipalities in Saxony-Anhalt
Saalekreis